Berenice  is a genus  of plants in the Campanulaceae. There is only one known species, Berenice arguta, endemic to the island of Réunion in the Indian Ocean.

References

Campanuloideae
Endemic flora of Réunion
Taxa named by Edmond Tulasne